Ugebladet Søndag (also known as Søndag) is a Danish language weekly lifestyle magazine which is headquartered in Copenhagen, Denmark. Launched in 1921 it is one of the oldest publications in the country.

History and profile
Ugebladet Søndag was established in 1921. It is part of Aller Media. The magazine comes out weekly and is based in Copenhagen. It covers articles addressing women. From 2015 Ugebladet Søndag had a semiannual supplement entitled Kvinder med Kurver (Danish: Women with Curves).

As of 2004 the circulation of magazine was 103,603 copies.

References

1921 establishments in Denmark
Danish-language magazines
Magazines established in 1921
Magazines published in Copenhagen
Weekly magazines published in Denmark
Women's magazines published in Denmark